Anthony Nelson (born March 4, 1997) is an American football outside linebacker for the Tampa Bay Buccaneers of the National Football League (NFL). He played college football at Iowa.

Professional career

Nelson was drafted by the Tampa Bay Buccaneers in the fourth round, 107th overall, of the 2019 NFL Draft.

In Week 16 of the 2020 season against the Detroit Lions, Nelson recorded his first career sack on David Blough during the 47–7 win. Nelson was a part of the Super Bowl LV champions Tampa Bay Buccaneers. He recorded four solo tackles across the postseason, including one in the Super Bowl.

On March 16, 2023, Nelson signed a two-year contract extension with the Buccaneers.

References

External links
Tampa Bay Buccaneers bio
Iowa Hawkeyes bio

1997 births
Living people
American football defensive ends
Iowa Hawkeyes football players
Tampa Bay Buccaneers players
American football outside linebackers